Banareia is a genus of crabs in the family Xanthidae, containing the following species:

 Banareia acies (Rathbun, 1911)
 Banareia armata A. Milne Edwards, 1869
 Banareia australis (Ward, 1936)
 Banareia balssi Guinot, 1976
 Banareia banareias (Rathbun, 1911)
 Banareia fatuhiva Davie, 1992
 Banareia inconspicua Miers, 1884
 Banareia japonica (Odhner, 1925)
 Banareia kraussi (Heller, 1861)
 Banareia nobilii (Odhner, 1925)
 Banareia odhneri Sakai, 1974
 Banareia palmeri (Rathbun, 1894)
 Banareia parvula (Krauss, 1843)
 Banareia serenei Guinot, 1976
 Banareia subglobosa (Stimpson, 1858)
 Banareia villosa Rathbun, 1906

References

Crustacean genera
Xanthoidea